Olimpiada may refer to:

 Olimpiada (given name)
 Olimpiada mine, a gold mine in Russia
 Olimpiada Neapolis, a volleyball club in Nicosia, Cyprus
 Olimpiada Neapolis FC, a former association football club in Nicosia, Cyprus

See also
 Olympiada (disambiguation)